The Mayor of Salford is a directly elected post created in 2012 for the City of Salford in Greater Manchester. The position is different from the long-existing and largely ceremonial, annually appointed ceremonial mayor of Salford.

Referendum
A petition of 10,500 Salford residents, started by the English Democrats, on a referendum on the creation of a directly elected mayor triggered the process of establishing a directly elected mayor for Salford.  The poll was held on 26 January 2012.

Elections

2012

In the first election for a directly elected mayor in May 2012, Ian Stewart, a Labour Party politician who was the Member of Parliament (MP) for Eccles from 1997 until 2010, was elected. During the campaign controversy surrounded Independent candidate Paul Massey who stated that he is not a criminal, after he was arrested in connection with allegations of money laundering.

2016

2021

The election was scheduled to take place in May 2020 but was delayed to 6 May 2021 due to COVID-19 pandemic, it took place alongside other local and regional elections in the United Kingdom.

List of mayors

References

Salford
Salford
Local government in Greater Manchester
 
Mayor of Salford